Tan Chun Seang (born 22 August 1986) is a Malaysian badminton player specializing in men's singles. His best achievement was won the Grand Prix title at the 2013 Canada Open by beating Eric Pang in the final. He was banned from playing in Asian countries for two years by Badminton Association of Malaysia due to his decision to quit the national team. In 2018, Tan was suspended by the Badminton World Federation and banned from participate in fifteen years for playing tournaments over match fixing allegations.

Career achievements 
Men's singles

Men's doubles

Notes: 
  Grand Prix tournaments
  International Challenge tournaments
  International Series tournaments

References 

1986 births
Living people
People from Kedah
Malaysian sportspeople of Chinese descent
Malaysian male badminton players
Competitors at the 2007 Southeast Asian Games
Southeast Asian Games bronze medalists for Malaysia
Southeast Asian Games medalists in badminton
21st-century Malaysian people